Mitch Osmond (born 11 March 1994) is an Australian soccer player who plays as a defender for Forward Madison FC in USL League One.

Career
Osmond began his college soccer at Calumet College of St. Joseph in 2015, before transferring to the University of Rio Grande in 2017. While at college, Osmond also appeared for USL PDL side Thunder Bay Chill between 2015 and 2017.

On January 14, 2019, Osmond was selected 94th overall in the 2019 MLS SuperDraft by Minnesota United.

On March 6, 2019, Osmond signed for USL Championship side Indy Eleven.

Osmond made the move to USL Championship side OKC Energy on December 17, 2020, ahead of the club's 2021 season.

Prior to the 2022 season, Osmond signed with USL League One club Forward Madison FC.

References

External links

1994 births
Living people
Australian soccer players
Australian expatriate soccer players
Thunder Bay Chill players
Minnesota United FC draft picks
Indy Eleven players
OKC Energy FC players
Forward Madison FC players
USL League Two players
USL League One players
USL Championship players
Association football defenders
Calumet College of St. Joseph people
Expatriate soccer players in the United States
Australian expatriate sportspeople in the United States
Rio Grande RedStorm men's soccer players
Bonnyrigg White Eagles FC players
Soccer players from Sydney